Here is a list of the extreme points and extreme elevations in Bangladesh

Extreme points

Extreme altitudes

See also

 Extreme points of India, shares border with Bangladesh
 Extreme points of Myanmar, shares border with Bangladesh
 Bangladesh-India border
 Bangladesh-Myanmar border

References

External links 
 http://onlinelibrary.wiley.com/doi/10.1002/jgrc.20310/full
 https://www.ncdo.nl/artikel/climate-change-its-impacts-bangladesh

Bangladesh
Bangladesh geography-related lists